The 2006–07 Winthrop Eagles men's basketball team represented Winthrop University during the 2006–07 college basketball season. This was head coach Gregg Marshall's ninth and final season at Winthrop. The Eagles competed in the Big South Conference and played their home games at Winthrop Coliseum. They finished the season 29–5, 14–0 in Big South play to finish as conference regular season champions. They won the 2007 Big South Conference men's basketball tournament to receive the conference's automatic bid to the 2007 NCAA Division I men's basketball tournament as No. 11 seed in the Midwest region. The Eagles defeated Notre Dame in the first round – the Big South’s first win in NCAA Tournament play – before falling to No. 3 seed Oregon in the Round of 32.

Winthrop finished the season ranked No. 22 in both major college basketball polls. After the season, Marshall left to take over as head coach at Wichita State. Assistant Randy Peele would be elevated to head coach for the 2007–08 season.

Roster 

Source

Schedule and results
Source
All times are Eastern

|-
!colspan=9 style=| Non-conference regular season

|-
!colspan=9 style=| Big South Regular Season

|-
!colspan=9 style=| Big South tournament

|-
!colspan=9 style=| NCAA tournament

Rankings

References

Winthrop
Winthrop
Winthrop Eagles men's basketball seasons
Winthrop Eagles
Winthrop Eagles